Bush Mill, also known as Bond Roller Mill, is a historic grist mill located near Nickelsville, Scott County, Virginia. It was built in 1896, and is a three-story, log and timber frame building on a limestone foundation.  It has a front gable roof sheathed in metal.  It measures 39 feet, 9 inches by 30 feet, 4 inches.  The mill has a 24-foot (diameter) and 4 feet wide overshot steel waterwheel added in the 1920s, which is intact and remains functional.  The building is maintained by the Nickelsville Ruritan Club.

It was listed on the National Register of Historic Places in 2008.

References

Grinding mills in Virginia
Grinding mills on the National Register of Historic Places in Virginia
Industrial buildings completed in 1896
Buildings and structures in Scott County, Virginia
National Register of Historic Places in Scott County, Virginia
1896 establishments in Virginia